Annapurnar Mandir was a Bengali social drama film directed by Naresh Mitra based on a same name novel of Nirupama Devi. This film was released on 6 August 1954 under the banner of Chitra Mandir and received 2nd National Film Awards in 1954.

Plot
Ramshankar is a poor man who lives with his two daughters. His elder daughter loves a young man but he arranges her marriage with an old man who is giving huge dowry. Soon she returns home as a widow. Owing to societal curse she commits suicide.

Cast
 Uttam Kumar
 Suchitra Sen
 Sabitri Chatterjee
 Shobha Sen
 Anup Kumar
 Naresh Mitra
 Tulsi Chakraborty
 Jiben Bose
 Molina Devi
 Mihir Bhattacharya
 Nibhanani Debi
 Tara Bhaduri
 Mita Bhattacharya

References

External links
 

1954 films
Bengali-language Indian films
1954 romantic drama films
Films based on Indian novels
Indian black-and-white films
Indian romantic drama films
1950s Bengali-language films
Films directed by Naresh Mitra